Florin Eugen Frunză (born 30 August 1970) is a Romanian former footballer who played as a forward.

Honours
Maramureș Baia Mare
Divizia B: 1993–94
Rapid București
Cupa României runner-up: 1994–95

References

1970 births
Living people
Romanian footballers
Association football forwards
Liga I players
Liga II players
Belgian Pro League players
Challenger Pro League players
CS Minaur Baia Mare (football) players
FC Rapid București players
K.R.C. Zuid-West-Vlaanderen players
K.S.V. Roeselare players
Romanian expatriate footballers
Expatriate footballers in Belgium
Romanian expatriate sportspeople in Belgium